The 2016–17 Deutsche Eishockey Liga season was the 23rd season since the founding of the Deutsche Eishockey Liga.

Hamburg Freezers did not play this season due to financial reasons. Fischtown Pinguins were given the license to play in the DEL.

Munich won their second consecutive title by defeating Wolfsburg in five games.

Teams

Regular season

Standings

Results

First half

Second half

Playoffs

Bracket

Playoff qualification
The playoff qualification was played between 1 and 3 March 2017 in a best-of-three mode.

ERC Ingolstadt vs. Fischtown Pinguins

Eisbären Berlin vs. Straubing Tigers

Quarterfinals
The quarterfinals will be played between 7 and 21 March 2017 in a best-of-seven mode.

EHC München vs. Fischtown Pinguins

Adler Mannheim vs. Eisbären Berlin

Thomas Sabo Ice Tigers vs. Augsburger Panther

Kölner Haie vs. EHC Wolfsburg

Semifinals
The semifinals were played between 24 March and 4 April 2017 in a best-of-seven mode.

EHC München vs. Eisbären Berlin

Thomas Sabo Ice Tigers vs. EHC Wolfsburg

Final
The final was played between 9 and 17 April 2017 in a best-of-seven mode.

EHC München vs. EHC Wolfsburg

References

External links
Official website

2016-17
2016–17 in European ice hockey leagues
2016–17 in German ice hockey